David Jameson may refer to:
 David Jameson (field hockey)
 David Jameson (governor)

See also
 David Jamieson (disambiguation)
 David Jamison (disambiguation)